Far Away may refer to:

Music

Albums 
 Far Away (Lasgo album) or the title song, 2005 
 Far Away (EP) or the title song, by Royal Hunt, 1995

Songs 
 "Far Away" (3+2 song), 2010
 "Far Away" (Ayumi Hamasaki song), 2000
 "Far Away" (Kindred the Family Soul song), 2003
 "Far Away" (Marsha Ambrosius song), 2010
 "Far Away" (Nickelback song), 2006
 "Far Away" (Tyga song), 2011
 "Far Away" (Wolfmother song), 2009
 "Far Away", by 12 Stones from Potter's Field
 "Far Away", by Beast Coast from Escape from New York
 "Far Away", by Breaking Benjamin
 "Far Away", by Chantal Kreviazuk from Colour Moving and Still
 "Far Away", by Dave Alvin from Romeo's Escape
 "Far Away", by Dave Edmunds from Riff Raff
 "Far Away", by Erik Vee, (2008)
 Cover by Basshunter from Calling Time
 "Far Away", by Freedom Call from Dimensions
 "Far Away", by Ingrid Michaelson from Girls and Boys
 "Far Away", by Jay Sean from All or Nothing
 "Far Away", by Joe Jackson from Fast Forward
 "Far Away", by John Frusciante from The Will to Death
 "Far Away", by José González from Red Dead Redemption Original Soundtrack
 "Far Away", by Lecrae
 "Far Away", by Lionel Bart from his musical Blitz! (1962)
 "Far Away", by Martha Wainwright from Martha Wainwright
 "Far Away", by Power Quest from Wings of Forever
 "Far Away", by Royce da 5'9" from Street Hop
 "Far Away", by Scorpions from Fly to the Rainbow
 "Far Away", by Supergrass from Supergrass
 "Be Quiet and Drive (Far Away)", by Deftones, 1998

Other media 
 Far Away (play), a 2000 play by Caryl Churchill
 Far Away (film), a Hong Kong film of 1954

See also 
 "Far Away, Far Away", a song by Noriyuki Makihara, covered by Tomiko Van from Voice 2: Cover Lovers Rock
 Faraway (disambiguation)
 Far Far Away (disambiguation)
 So Far Away (disambiguation)
 Far and Away, a 1992 film starring Tom Cruise and Nicole Kidman